This list is made up of notable people born or resides in Manila, the capital of the Philippines.

National heroes and patriots
Andrés Bonifacio – Filipino nationalist, revolutionary leader and founder of Katipunan
Gregoria de Jesús – founder and vice-president of the women's chapter of the Katipunan of the Philippines. She was also the custodian of the documents and seal of the Katipunan. Wife of Andrés Bonifacio.
Emilio Jacinto – Filipino General during the Philippine Revolution
Julio Nakpil –  Filipino musician, composer and a General during the Philippine Revolution
Antonio Luna – Filipino pharmacist and general who fought in the Philippine–American War
José Palma –  poet and soldier. He was on the staff of La Independencia at the time he wrote "Filipinas", a patriotic poem in Spanish that is since been the basis for every translation of the lyrics of Philippine National Anthem.
Jacinto Zamora and  Mariano Gomes – Filipino Catholic priests, part of the Gomburza, a trio of priests who were falsely accused of mutiny by the Spanish colonial authorities in the Philippines in the 19th century.
Teodora Alonso Realonda - mother of José Rizal 
Trinidad Pardo de Tavera – Filipino propagandist, physician, historian and politician
Macario Sakay – Filipino Revolutionay General
Francisco Carreón – Filipino Revolutionay General
Edilberto Evangelista – Filipino Revolutionary General
Flaviano Yengko – Filipino Revolutionary General
Licerio Gerónimo – general of the Philippine Revolutionary Forces under Emilio Aguinaldo during Philippine–American War
Marina Dizon –  heroine of the Philippine Revolution and one of the first women initiated into the Katipunan. She also kept important documents for the Katipunan.
José Dizon – Filipino patriot who was among those who founded the Katipunan that sparked the Philippine Revolution
Román Ongpin – Filipino-Chinese businessman and philanthropist who aided Filipino revolutionaries against the Spanish and American colonial administration in the Philippine islands.
Mariano Limjap – Filipino-Chinese businessman and philanthropist who helped in the Philippine Revolution and the Filipino-American War.
Agueda Esteban – Filipina revolutionary
Hermenegildo Cruz – writer and trade union organizer. He was a founding member of Unión Obrera Democrática Filipina and a member of the Philippine Assembly. He became Director of the Bureau of Labor in 1924.
Gregorio S. Araneta – Filipino lawyer, businessman, and nationalist, during the Spanish and American colonial periods.
Pablo Ocampo – Filipino lawyer, nationalist, a member of the Malolos Congress, first Resident Commissioner from the Philippine Islands to the United States Congress
 Rosa Sevilla – Filipino activist, educator, and journalist who advocated for women's suffrage in the Philippines.
Concepción Felix – Filipina feminist and human rights activist. She established one of the first women's organizations in the Philippines, Asociación Feminista Filipina, as well as one of the first humanitarian NGOs, La Gota de Leche, aimed specifically at the well-being of mothers and their children. On several occasions, she spoke to legislators to promote women's enfranchisement.
Benito Legarda – Filipino legislator who was a member of the Philippine Commission of the American colonial Insular Government, the government's legislature, and later a Resident Commissioner from the Philippine Islands to the United States Congress.
Edgar Jopson – labor rights and student activist, and freedom fighter during the reign of Martial law under Ferdinand Marcos.
Gaston Z. Ortigas  – freedom fighter, agrarian reformer, entrepreneur, and peace advocate best known for his opposition to the Martial Law dictatorship of Ferdinand Marcos,
Cristina Catalla, Jessica Sales, and Gerry Faustino  – anti-martial law activists that were abducted by state security agents and disappeared with seven other activists in what is believed to be the single biggest case of involuntary disappearance during Ferdinand Marcos' martial law in the Philippines that later came to be known as the Southern Tagalog 10.

National Scientists
Fe del Mundo – National Scientist of the Philippines for Pediatrics
Jose Encarnacion Jr. – National Scientist of the Philippines for Economics
Alfredo Lagmay – National Scientist of the Philippines for Experimental Psychology
Benito Vergara- National Scientist of the Philippines for Plant Physiology
Teodulo Topacio, Jr. – National Scientist of the Philippines for Veterinary Medicine
Edgardo Gomez – National Scientist of the Philippines for Marine Biology

National Artists
Ryan Cayabyab – National Artist of the Philippines for Music
Levi Celerio – National Artist of the Philippines for Music and Literature
Lucrecia Roces Kasilag – National Artist of the Philippines for Music
Antonio Molina – National Artist of the Philippines for Music
Andrea Veneracion – National Artist of the Philippines for Music
Alice Reyes – National Artist of the Philippines for Dance
Atang de la Rama – -National Artist of the Philippines for Theater 
Wilfrido Ma. Guerrero -National Artist of the Philippines for Theater 
Amelia Lapeña-Bonifacio -National Artist of the Philippines for Theater 
Rolando Tinio – National Artist of the Philippines for Theater and Literature
Federico Aguilar Alcuaz – National Artist of the Philippines for Visual Arts – Painting, Sculpture and Mixed Media
Fernando Amorsolo – National Artist of the Philippines for Visual Arts – Painting
Jose T. Joya – National Artist of the Philippines for Visual Arts – Painting
Cesar Legaspi – National Artist of the Philippines for Visual Arts – Painting
Arturo R. Luz -National Artist of the Philippines for Visual Arts – Painting
Hernando R. Ocampo – National Artist of the Philippines for Visual Arts – Painting
Ishmael Bernal – National Artist of the Philippines for Film
Gerardo de León – National Artist of the Philippines for Film
Fernando Poe Jr. – National Artist of the Philippines for Film
Francisco Arcellana – National Artist of the Philippines for Literature
Cirilo Bautista– National Artist of the Philippines for Literature
Gémino Abad – National Artist of the Philippines for Literature
Amado V. Hernandez– National Artist of the Philippines for Literature
Nick Joaquin – National Artist of the Philippines for Literature
Alejandro Roces – National Artist of the Philippines for Literature
Jose Garcia Villa – National Artist of the Philippines for Literature
Carlos Quirino– National Artist of the Philippines for Historical Literature
Pablo Antonio– National Artist of the Philippines for Architecture
Francisco Mañosa -National Artist of the Philippines for Architecture
Juan Nakpil – National Artist of the Philippines for Architecture
Ramón Valera – National Artist of the Philippines for Architecture, Design and Allied Arts – Fashion Design
José María Zaragoza – National Artist of the Philippines for Architecture

Politics and Government

Executive branch and Executive departments 
 Joseph Estrada — 13th President of the Philippines, 9th Vice President of the Philippines, 26th Mayor of Manila, 14th San Juan Mayor, actor
 Bongbong Marcos — 17th President of the Philippines,  former House Representative of the 2nd district of Ilocos Norte,  former Governor of Ilocos Norte, and former Philippine senator
 Salvador Laurel — 8th Vice President of the Philippines
 Pedro Paterno – 2nd Prime Minister of the Philippines
Jose Diokno – 32nd Secretary of the Department of Justice, founding chairman of the Commission on Human Rights and former Philippine senator
Juan Flavier – 18th Secretary of the Department of Health and former Philippine senator
Raul Manglapus – 18th Secretary of the Department of the Foreign Affairs and former Philippine senator
Vicente Paterno – 18th Secretary of the Department of Trade and Industry and former Philippine senator
Orlando S. Mercado – 20th Secretary of the Department of the Defense and former Philippine senator
Alfredo S. Lim − 19th Secretary of the Department of the Interior and Local Government, former Philippine senator, 19th Mayor of Manila, and former NBI director
Lito Atienza  – 30th Secretary of the Department of Environment and Natural Resources, 20th Mayor of Manila, Party-list Representative for Buhay
Solita Monsod – 5th Director-General of the National Economic Development Authority
Joaquín Miguel Elizalde– 6th Secretary of the Department of the Foreign Affairs
Albert del Rosario – 24th Secretary of the Department of the Foreign Affairs
Andrew Gonzalez – 30th Secretary of the Department of the Education
Florencio Abad – 33rd Secretary of the Department of the Education, 10th Secretary of the Department of the Budget and Management, and 9th Secretary of the Department of Agrarian Reform
Catalino Macaraig Jr. – 23rd Executive Secretary
Salvador Medialdea – 38th Executive Secretary
Ignacio Bunye – former Presidential Spokesperson and Press Secretary, former mayor and first congressman of Muntinlupa
Florin Hilbay – former Solicitor General of the Philippines
Alfredo Benipayo – 18th Chairman of the Commission on Elections
Raymundo Punongbayan – former director of the Philippine Institute of Volcanology and Seismology (PHIVOLCS)
Esperanza Osmeña – former First Lady of the Philippines
Imelda Marcos – former First Lady of the Philippines and politician
Amelita Ramos – former First Lady of the Philippines

Legislative Branch 
 Arturo Tolentino – 12th President of the Senate of the Philippines, 15th Secretary of the Department of Foreign Affairs
 Gil Puyat – 13th President of the Senate of the Philippines
Manny Villar – 25th President of the Senate of the Philippines, 18th Speaker of the House of Representatives of the Philippines, and businessman 
Tito Sotto  – 23rd President of the Senate of the Philippines, former Vice-mayor of Quezon City, actor and comedian
Rafael Palma – former Philippine senator, 4th President of the University of the Philippines, and writer
Eva Estrada Kalaw – former Philippine senator
Ambrosio Padilla – former Philippine senator, Member of the Philippine Constitutional Commission of 1986, and former basketball player 
Macario Peralta Jr. – former Philippine senator, and 13th Secretary of the Department of National Defense
Pacita Madrigal-Warns – former Philippine senator
Helena Benitez – former Philippine senator
Maria Kalaw Katigbak – former Philippine senator
Butz Aquino – former Philippine senator
Freddie Webb –former Philippine senator and former professional basketball player 
Nikki Coseteng- former Philippine senator
Jamby Madrigal- former Philippine senator
Bam Aquino – former Philippine senator
Risa Hontiveros – Senator of the Philippines
Francis Pangilinan – Senator of the Philippines
Vilma Santos – incumbent House Representative of the 6th district of Batangas,  22nd Governor of Batangas, and film actress
Sarah Elago – activist and House Representative of Kabataan Partylist

Judicial Branch  
Roberto Concepcion – 10th Chief Justice of the Supreme Court of the Philippines, and Member of the Philippine Constitutional Commission of 1986.
Enrique Fernando – 13th Chief Justice of the Supreme Court of the Philippines
Claudio Teehankee – 16th Chief Justice of the Supreme Court of the Philippines
Andres Narvasa – 19th Chief Justice of the Supreme Court of the Philippines
Artemio Panganiban – 21st Chief Justice of the Supreme Court of the Philippines
Reynato Puno – 22nd Chief Justice of the Supreme Court of the Philippines
Renato Corona – 23rd Chief Justice of the Supreme Court of the Philippines
Maria Lourdes Sereno – de facto 24th Chief Justice of the Supreme Court of the Philippines
Florentino Torres – 3rd Associate Justice of the Supreme Court of the Philippines
J. B. L. Reyes – 64th Associate Justice of the Supreme Court of the Philippines
Isagani Cruz – 113th Associate Justice of the Supreme Court of the Philippines
Florentino P. Feliciano – 115th Associate Justice of the Supreme Court of the Philippines
Flerida Ruth Pineda-Romero – 125th Associate Justice of the Supreme Court of the Philippines, and Secretary-General of the Philippine Constitutional Commission of 1986.
Jose Melo – 128th Associate Justice of the Supreme Court of the Philippines, and 20th Chairman of the Commission on Elections
Bernardo P. Pardo – 142nd Associate Justice of the Supreme Court of the Philippines
Alicia Austria-Martinez – 149th Associate Justice of the Supreme Court of the Philippines
Noel Tijam – 176th Associate Justice of the Supreme Court of the Philippines
Amy Lazaro-Javier – 182nd Associate Justice of the Supreme Court of the Philippines
Priscilla Baltazar-Padilla – 188th Associate Justice of the Supreme Court of the Philippines
Natividad Almeda-López -first female lawyer in the Philippines, passing the bar in 1914 and the first woman to defend a woman in a court of law. She was also the first female judge of the municipal court of Manila.

Diplomacy 
León María Guerrero III – former ambassador, historian, and writer
Marcial Lichauco – former ambassador, diplomat, and writer
Narciso G. Reyes – former ambassador, diplomat, former Chairman of UNICEF, and 4th Secretary General of the Association of Southeast Asian Nations

Local Government 
Arsenio Cruz Herrera – first Filipino Mayor of Manila 
Ramon Bagatsing – 17th and the longest-serving Mayor of Manila 
Larry Silva – 21st Vice Mayor of Manila, former Manila City councilor from the 3rd district, actor and comedian
Carmen Planas – known as "Manila's Darling", was the first woman to be elected to any public offices in the Philippines when she was elected councilor of Manila by general suffrage in 1934. She would later serve as the capital city's Vice Mayor from 1940 to 1941 and again from 1946 to 1951.
Lou Veloso – incumbent Manila City councilor from the 6th district, actor and comedian

Military and Law Enforcement 
Basilio Valdes – 3rd Chief of Staff of the Armed Forces of the Philippines, 3rd Secretary of the Department of National Defense, and 2nd Secretary of the Department of Health
Jesus Vargas –  7th Chief of Staff of the Armed Forces of the Philippines, 11th Secretary of the Department of National Defense
Alfredo Santos – 11th Chief of Staff of the Armed Forces of the Philippines 
Manuel Yan – 16th Chief of Staff of the Armed Forces of the Philippines, and 17th Secretary of the Department of the Foreign Affairs
Angelo Reyes – 28th Chief of Staff of the Armed Forces of the Philippines, 21st Secretary of the Department of National Defense, 21st Secretary of the Department of Interior and Local Government, 29th Secretary of the Department of Environment and Natural Resources, and 10th  Secretary of the Department of Energy
Gregorio Pio Catapang – 45th Chief of Staff of the Armed Forces of the Philippines
Rogelio Morales – former Navy captain, master mariner, educator, and activist during the reign of Martial law under Ferdinand Marcos.
Antonio Taguba – retired United States Army major general and second American citizen of Philippine birth to be promoted to general officer rank in the United States Army.
 George Fleming Davis – US Navy officer and Medal of Honor recipient.
 Antonio C. Torres  first Filipino Chief of Police of the Manila Police Department, founder and first Supreme Commander of the Order of the Knights of Rizal

Religion
Lorenzo Ruiz – first Catholic Filipino saint
José María of Manila – Spanish-Filipino Roman Catholic blessed, and was priest of the Order of Friars Minor Capuchin. He was martyred in the early phase of the Spanish Civil War, and is the third Filipino to have been declared blessed by the Roman Catholic Church.
Ignacia del Espíritu Santo – Catholic Venerable, founder the Congregation of the Sisters of the Religious of the Virgin Mary, the first native Filipino female congregation with approved pontifical status in what is now the Republic of the Philippines.
Francisca del Espíritu Santo Fuentes – Catholic Venerable, first Prioress of the Dominican Sisters of Saint Catherine of Siena in the Philippines.
Isabel Larrañaga Ramírez – Catholic Venerable, Spanish-Filipina  nun and foundress who is venerated in the Roman Catholic Church.
Joaquina Maria Mercedes Barcelo Pages – Catholic Venerable, Spanish Augustinian nun who cofounded the Augustinian Sisters of Our Lady of Consolation
Rolando Joven Tria Tirona OCD, D.D., Archbishop of the Archdiocese of Caceres and Bishop Emeritus of Prelature of Infanta and Diocese of Malolos
Diosdado Talamayan – Roman Catholic archbishop. Former auxiliary bishop and second archbishop of the Archdiocese of Tuguegarao.
Mylo Hubert Vergara – 2nd Bishop of the Diocese of Pasig, 3rd Bishop of San Jose from February 12, 2005 to April 20, 2011.
Federico O. Escaler, S.J. – Roman Catholic Bishop of the Diocese of Kidapawan and the Diocese of Ipil
Nicolás Zamora – founder of the first indigenous evangelical church in the Philippines, known as Iglesia Evangelica Metodista en las Islas Filipinas. Zamora is also recognized as the first Filipino Protestant minister in the Philippines.
Dionisio Deista Alejandro – first Filipino Bishop of the Methodist Church, elected in 1944.
 Jose C. Abriol – Filipino Catholic priest, linguist, and high official in the church in the Philippines. He was the first to translate the Catholic Bible into Tagalog, the native language for most Filipinos.
Roque Ferriols, S.J. –Filipino Jesuit philosopher known for pioneering the use of Tagalog in philosophizing.
Mary Therese Vicente – Filipino Roman Catholic nun, foundress of the Sisters of the Holy Face of Jesus of Perpetual Adoration
Mary Christine Tan – Filipino missionary, nun, and activist, who was known to be one of the key figures who was against the human rights abuses during the Martial law era. She headed the Association of Major Religious Superiors of Women (AMRSP) from 1973–1976, a group of religious sisters who not only vocalized their disdain against the Martial Law dictatorship of Ferdinand Marcos, but also managed to help Filipinos who are suffering from poverty. Member of the Philippine Constitutional Commission of 1986.

Literature
José de la Cruz – "Hari ng Makatang Tagalog"
Patricio Mariano – nationalist, revolutionary, pundit, poet, playwright, dramatist, short story writer, novelist, journalist, violinist, and painter.
Severino Reyes –  writer, playwright, and director of plays, "Father of the Tagalog Zarzuela".
Juan Abad – playwright and journalist
Fernando María Guerrero – poet
Cecilio Apóstol – poet
Jesús Balmori –  Filipino Spanish language journalist, playwright, and poet.
Faustino Aguilar – pioneering Filipinosocial realist novelist, journalist, revolutionary, union leader, and editor.
Alberto Segismundo Cruz – Poet and novelist
Iñigo Ed. Regalado – Poet, journalist, and novelist
Iñigo C. Regalado – Poet and novelist
Rosauro Almario – writer
José Corazón de Jesús – Tagalog poet, King of the Balagtasan
Genoveva Matute – author 
Carmen Guerrero Nakpil – journalist, author, historian and public servant
Bienvenido Santos – Filipino-American fiction, poetry and nonfiction writer
Gilda Cordero-Fernando – writer and publisher
Clodualdo del Mundo Sr. – novelist, playwright, essayist, short story writer, journalist, screenwriter, teacher, critic
Virginia R. Moreno – writer and playwright
Pablo S. Gomez – komiks writer, screenwriter and director.
E. San Juan Jr. – literary critic
Teo Antonio  – poet
Lualhati Bautista – novelist, film and television screenwriter
Jessica Hagedorn – playwright, writer, poet, multimedia performance artist
Loizza Aquino – writer, mental health activist, and founder of Peace of Mind Canada and co-founder of Student Mental Health Canada.

Visual arts
Marcel Antonio – painter
Elmer Borlongan – painter
Eduardo Castrillo – sculptor
Roberto Chabet – conceptual artist and architect
Fabián de la Rosa – painter
Camille Dela Rosa – painter and former child star
Damián Domingo – painter
Paco Gorospe – painter
Graciano Nepomuceno – sculptor
Félix Resurrección Hidalgo – artist
Nestor Leynes – hyperrealistic painter
Anita Magsaysay-Ho – painter
José Honorato Lozano – painter
Malang – cartoonist, illustrator, and fine arts painter
Onib Olmedo – painter
Alfonso A. Ossorio – Filipino–American abstract expressionist artist
Fernando Sena – painter
Tony Velasquez – Filipino illustrator regarded as the Father of Tagalog comics and as the pioneer and founding father of the Philippine comics industry.  He was the creator of Kenkoy, an "iconic Philippine comic strip character".
Fernando Zóbel de Ayala y Montojo – Spanish–Filipino painter, businessman, art collector.

Architecture
Carlos Arguelles – architect
Arcadio Arellano – architect
Juan M. Arellano – architect
Tomás Mapúa – architect
Carlos A. Santos-Viola – architect

Sciences and Education
Anacleto del Rosario – chemist, "Father of Philippine Science and Laboratory"
León María Guerrero – Filipino writer, revolutionary leader, politician, the first licensed pharmacist in the Philippines, and one of the most eminent botanists in the country in his time.
Manuel A. Zamora – Filipino chemist and pharmacist best known for his discovery of the tiki-tiki formula against beriberi.
Manuel S. Guerrero – medical doctor who studied beriberi in infants in the Philippines.
Renato Constantino – nationalist historian
Ricardo Manapat – scholar, writer, researcher, and author of Some Are Smarter Than Others: The History of Marcos' Crony Capitalism", a work on anti-cronyism exposing the wealth of the Marcos dynasty. 
Lydia Yu-Jose – professor of political science and Japanese Studies at the Ateneo de Manila University  best known for her research into the history of Japan–Philippines relations, as well as aiding in the development of Japanese studies in the Philippines as a separate academic discipline.
Jaime C. Bulatao, S.J. – Filipino Jesuit priest and psychologist. 
Armand Mijares – Filipino archaeologist 
Librada Avelino and Carmen de Luna  -Filipina educators and founders of Centro Escolar University.
Onofre R. Pagsanghan – educator, screenplay writer
Don Moon – President of Shimer College
Dr. Jose Antonio (professor of sports nutrition)

Performing Arts and Entertainment

Music 
Ladislao Bonus – "Father of the Filipino opera".
Dolores Paterno – Filipina composer known for the song "La Flor de Manila" (also known as "Sampaguita").
Francisco Santiago – musician, sometimes called The Father of Kundiman Art Song.
Lea Salonga – film actress, singer
Basil Valdez – singer and composer
Hajji Alejandro – singer
Rico J. Puno – singer
Raymond Lauchengco – singer
Ariel Rivera  singer
Louie Ocampo – composer and arranger
Mel Villena – arranger
Arnel Pineda – lead singer of the American rock band Journey  since 2008
Gary Valenciano – singer, songwriter, gospel musician, actor, host and musical director
Francis Magalona – singer and rapper
Billy Crawford – singer
Lolita Carbon – singer and guitarist, member of ASIN
Wally Gonzalez – guitarist and member of Juan de la Cruz Band
Chito Miranda – singer-songwriter, and lead vocalist for the band Parokya ni Edgar.
Sarah Geronimo – film actress, host, television actress, brand ambassador and singer
Angeline Quinto – film and television actress, singer and host
Sam Concepcion – film and television actor, singer, host, dancer and VJ
Cris Villonco – singer 
Jay-R Siaboc – singer 
Mica Javier – singer
Maiko Nakamura – RNB singer and record producer based in Tokyo, Japan
Zsa Zsa Padilla – singer
Idris Vicuña aka Eyedress – singer and songwriter

Dance 
Lisa Macuja-Elizalde – first Filipina Prima Ballerina
Roberto Villanueva – dancer, choreographer, and producer.
Jopay Paguia – dancer, original member of the SexBomb Girls

Film and Television 
José Nepomuceno – one of the pioneering directors and producers of Philippine cinema. Known as the "Father of Philippine movies", he produced and directed the first Filipino silent film entitled Dalagang Bukid in 1919.
Lily Monteverde – film producer
Joey Gosiengfiao – film director
Robert Arevalo  actor and director
Danny Zialcita – film director
Mike De Leon – film director
Maryo J. de los Reyes – film and television director
Soxie Topacio – film and actor, and director
Gina Alajar   actress and television director
Rory Quintos – film and television director
Wenn V. Deramas – film and television director
Auraeus Solito – film director
Gino M. Santos – film director
Dolphy – actor and comedian
Panchito Alba – actor and comedian
Chicháy – comedienne and actress
Cachupoy – actor and comedian
Dely Atay-Atayan – comedienne and singer
 Babalu – actor and comedian
Mila del Sol – film actress
Bella Flores – film actress
Tony Santos Sr. – film and television actor
Berting Labra – film and television actor
Max Alvarado – film and television actor
 Mona Lisa – film actress
German Moreno – television host and comedian
Gloria Romero – film and television actress
Luis Gonzales – film and television actor
Armando Goyena – film and television actor
Rosa Rosal – film actress
Charito Solis – film actress
Alicia Vergel – film and television actress
Boots Anson-Roa – film and television actress, columnist, editor, and lecturer
Rosemarie Gil – film actress
Eddie Mesa – actor and singer
Tirso Cruz III – film and television actor
Gina Pareño – film and television actress
Bomber Moran – film and television actor
Bernardo Bernardo – stage actor, comedian, and film director
Maricel Soriano  – film actress 
Jay Ilagan – film and television actor
Amy Austria – film and television actress
Sandy Andolong – film and television actress
Alfie Anido – film actor
Subas Herrero – stage and film actor, comedian
Joonee Gamboa – actor
Johnny Delgado – film and television actor
Vic Sotto  actor and comedian
Helen Gamboa – veteran actress
Joey de Leon – actor, comedian, and television host
Michael De Mesa – film and television actor
Mark Gil – film and television actor
Cherie Gil – film and television actress
Rene Requiestas – actor and comedian
Richie D'Horsie – actor and comedian
Cherry Pie Picache – film and television actress
Coney Reyes – film and television actress
Helen Gamboa  veteran actress
Pen Medina – actor
Niño Muhlach – film and television actor
Aga Muhlach – film and television actor
Chin Chin Gutierrez – film and television actress and environmentalist
Snooky Serna – film actress
Eula Valdez  actress
Matet De Leon  – actress
Eugene Domingo – film and television actress
Isabelle Daza – actress
Keempee de Leon  actor
Heart Evangelista  actress and socialite 
Nonie Buencamino – actor
Bodjie Pascua – actor, teacher
Michael V. – actor and comedian
John Lapus – comedian
Paolo Contis – actor
Mark Anthony Fernandez – actor 
Camille Prats – actress
Jacob Benedicto – actor and singer
Jojo Alejar  actor and comedian
Karylle  actress 
Piolo Pascual – actor
Ara Mina – film and television actress, fashion model and singer
Desiree Del Valle – actress
Adrian Alandy  actor
Boom Labrusca – actor
DJ Durano – actor
Claudine Barretto – actress
Raymart Santiago – actor
Sunshine Cruz – actress
KC Concepcion – actress
Andrea Torres – film and television actress, host and commercial model
Kate Valdez – film and television actress and model
Pia Guanio – actress
Beverly Vergel – film actress, director, producer, ramp model and public speaker
Mikee Quintos – film and television actress and singer
Mylene Dizon – dramatic actress
Polo Ravales – film and television actor and fashion model
Marvin Agustin – film and television actor
Jose Manalo – actor and comedian
Maxene Magalona – actress
Bea Nicolas – film and television actress
Valerie Concepcion  actress
Francine Diaz – actress
Vice Ganda – film and television actor, lipstick owner, brand ambassador, host and vlogger
Coco Martin – actor
Julia Montes – film and television actress, host and model
Matt Evans – actor
JC de Vera – actor
JM De Guzman – actor
Manny Jacinto – actor
Zaijan Jaranilla  actor
Arjo Atayde – actor
Sofia Andres – actress
McCoy de Leon  actor
Heaven Peralejo – film, television actress and painter
Joaquin Domagoso – actor and model
Joyce Pring  actress
Donita Nose – comedian

Journalism and media
Armando Malay – journalist, scholar, and activist during the Marcos administration.
Gus Abelgas – host and journalist
Kim Atienza – television host, actor, and weather anchor
Inday Badiday – host and journalist
Louie Beltran – broadcast journalist and newspaper columnist
Teodoro Benigno – Journalist, writer
Angelo Castro Jr. – broadcast journalist
Arnold Clavio – television host
Karen Davila – broadcast journalist
DJ Chacha – radio disc jockey
James Deakin  TV show host and colunmist
Mike Enriquez – TV and radio newscaster
Jove Francisco – broadcast journalist
Betty Go-Belmonte -Journalist, newspaper publisher, co-founder of Philippine Daily Inquirer, The Philippine STAR and Pilipino Star Ngayon
Bianca Gonzales – television host
June Keithley – broadcast journalist
Rico Hizon – broadcast journalist
Pia Hontiveros– broadcast journalist
Vicky Morales – TV newscaster
Tina Monzon-Palma – broadcast journalist
Dong Puno – former television public affairs host, media executive, newspaper columnist, and lawyer.
Maria Ressa – Filipino-American journalist and author, co-founder and CEO of Rappler, and the first Filipino Nobel Prize laureate.
 Joaquin "Chino" Roces – nationalist, newspaper publisher, and freedom fighter during the reign of Martial law under Ferdinand Marcos.
Abraham Sarmiento Jr. – Filipino student journalist who gained prominence as an early and visible critic of the martial law government of President Ferdinand Marcos. editor-in-chief of the Philippine Collegian.
Howie Severino – broadcast journalist and documentarist
Lolit Solis – talk show host, entertainment news writer, and talent manager.
Max Soliven – journalist, newspaper publisher, activist, television host, co-founder of the Philippine Star
Jose Mari Velez – TV newscaster, lawyer, journalist, business executive, and activist.
Isagani Yambot – former publisher of the Philippine Daily Inquirer

Business
Jorge L. Araneta – CEO, Chairman, and President of The Araneta Group
Felipe Gozon –  Chairman and CEO of GMA Network, Inc.
Mark López  chairman of ABS-CBN Corporation
Roberto Ongpin – Chairman, CEO, and Director of Alphaland Corporation
Manuel V. Pangilinan – owner of Philippine Long Distance Telephone Company, Metro Pacific Investments Corporation, TV5 and Philex Mining
Enrique K. Razon – billionaire and the chairman and CEO of the International Container Terminal Services, Inc. (ICTSI), Chairman of Bloomberry Resorts Corp. (BRC), developer of Solaire Resort and Casino
Andrés Soriano Sr. –  Spanish Filipino industrialist and  philanthropist
Henry Sy – owner of SM Investments Corporation, SM Prime Holdings, SM Development Corporation and Highlands Prime Holdings, Banco de Oro and Chinabank
Andrew Tan – owner of Alliance Global Group, Megaworld Corporation and Golden Arches Development Corporation
George Ty – owner of Metropolitan Bank and Trust Company
Emilio Yap – Chinese Filipino business tycoon. He was the chairman of the board of the Manila Bulletin.
Alfonso Yuchengco – headed the Yuchengco Group of Companies, one of the largest family-owned business conglomerates in the Philippines.
Fernando Zobel de Ayala – businessman, president and chief executive officer of Ayala Corporation

Culinary arts
Cristeta Comerford – Filipino-American chef who has been the White House Executive Chef since 2005. She is the first woman and first person of Asian origin to hold the post.
Ma Mon Luk – Chinese restaurateur.

Fashion
Brent Chua – fashion model and photographer
 Pitoy Moreno – fashion designer. 
 Josie Natori – Filipino American fashion designer. 
 Ricky Reyes  hairdresser
 Kermit Tesoro – accessories and fashion designer.

Pageants
Gemma Cruz-Araneta – writer, director, and beauty queen who won Miss International 1964, becoming the first Filipino and Asian to win the title.
Maria Teresa Carlson – Binibining Pilipinas–Young 1979 and film actress
 April Love Jordan – Mutya ng Pilipinas 2006 2nd Runner-up, Beauty of the World 2009, Miss International Beauty & Model winner 2009 and Miss World Philippines 2012 3rd Princess 
Bianca Manalo – Miss Universe – Philippines 2009, film and television actress and host
Margarita Moran – Miss Universe 1973
Joanne Quintas – Binibining Pilipinas – Universe 1995 and Miss Tourism International (Macau Version) 1997
Daisy Reyes – Binibining Pilipinas – World 1996, film and television actress, singer, TV host, politician and businesswoman

Sports
EJ Obiena  track and field
Hector Calma – basketball player
Dionisio Calvo – swimmer
Monsour del Rosario – martial artist, actor, producer and politician
Luisito Espinosa – boxer
Jasmin Figueroa – archer
Danny Florencio – basketball player
Zema Ion – professional wrestler
Christine Jacob – swimmer
Lim Eng Beng – basketball player
Charlie Kendall – American football player
Samboy Lim – basketball player
Carlos Loyzaga – basketball player
Chito Loyzaga – basketball player
Miguel Mendoza – swimmer
Frankie Miñoza – golfer
Paeng Nepomuceno – bowler
Benjie Paras – basketball player
Efren Reyes – pool player and actor
Jennifer Rosales – swimmer
Jason Sabio – footballer
Marlon Stöckinger – race car driver
Tim Tebow – former American football and baseball player
Yannick Tuason – footballer
Carlos Yulo –  gymnast

Other
Muelmar Magallanes – 18-year-old construction worker and hero who died saving 30 lives during Typhoon Ketsana

See also
List of people from Metro Manila

References

People from Manila
Manila